Happy Can Already! 4 is a Singapore dialect variety series which is telecast on Singapore's free-to-air channel, Mediacorp Channel 8 starring Jack Neo, Mark Lee, Henry Thia, Wang Lei and Jaspers Lai. It is broadcast every Friday from 11.30am to 12.30pm. Jack Neo will reprise Liang Popo for the first time after 24 years.

Cast

Happy Make-a-guess

Music

Trivia
On 15 October 2018, a media conference was held at Swatow Seafood Restaurant Toa Payoh with artistes Jack Neo, Marcus Chin, Henry Thia, Wang Lei and Ho Ailing.

See also
Happy Can Already!
Happy Can Already! 2
Happy Can Already! 3
List of variety and infotainment programmes broadcast by MediaCorp Channel 8

References

Singaporean television series